The Monagh River is a river in Ireland. The river flows through three counties Westmeath. Offaly and Meath. The river is also connected to other rivers in the area including Milltown River in Westmeath, and the Yellow River on the Meath, Offaly border. The mouth of the river is about 0.7 miles (1.12 km) south of Castlejordan while the head of the river is about 0.2 miles (0.32 km) east of Smithstown.

External links
Village plan

Rivers of County Westmeath
Rivers of County Offaly
Rivers of County Meath